The Southwest Rail Corridor is a proposed commuter rail line serving southwestern Houston. The line connects Missouri City to METRORail's current Fannin South. It then merges with METRORail's Red line and ends at the Museum District.

History
As the population in both Harris County and Fort Bend County grew, more commuters started to go to central Houston. The area with most commuters from Fort Bend County is the Texas Medical Center with 24,000 daily trips. This is where 33% of the trips are headed to. The number of commuters is expected to reach 32,000 by 2035.

Rolling Stock
While it is still on debate to use light rail, electric locomotive, or diesel locomotive as the trains, as of 2012 articles have shown that light rail will likely be the fleet used.

References

Proposed railway lines in Texas
Greater Houston